Domonique Ramirez is an American beauty pageant titleholder from Texas; she was the winner of Miss San Antonio 2010.

She temporarily lost her title after Miss San Antonio pageant officials complained that Ramirez had gained weight. Ramirez was allegedly told to "get off the tacos". Ramirez sued pageant officials for stripping her of her title and crown. On March 23, 2011, Ramirez won a lawsuit against the pageant officials which saw her getting her crown and title back. Ramirez will now participate in the Miss Texas final for Miss America.

The jury deliberated for 12 hours over a two-day period before coming to a unanimous verdict. After the positive verdict for Ramirez, pageant director Linda Woods said "It's a sad day for us. We think the judge and jury made a huge mistake. It's an injustice for the city of San Antonio, it allows young kids to breach contracts and violate authority without any consequences ... It sends the wrong message." Pageant officials said it wasn't that Domonique Ramirez had gained weight that was at issue. Rather they claimed that Ramirez was "unreliable, chronically showing up late or skipping events such as grocery store openings to go to paid appearances, and violated her contract in ways ranging from not writing thank-you notes to blowing off a physical fitness program and vocal lessons." Woods also stated that "She (Ramirez) was doing a photo shoot and asked to wear her wardrobe from the competition, but it did not fit her. I told her we need to get you on an exercise program. We need to get ready to compete for Miss Texas, just like any elite athlete."

Ramirez had earlier in February failed to gain a temporary respite from being stripped of her crown. The title went to the first runner-up, Ashley Dixon, instead, who continued as Miss San Antonio 2010 the day Ramirez won her lawsuit. The trial verdict was met with applause inside the courtroom.  On Ashley Dixon, Ramirez said "I don't plan on taking the crown away from Ashley. I'm hoping that we'll be able to share and she can go to Miss Texas as well as Miss Bexar County, and we can both share the crown,".

References 

American beauty pageant winners
Beauty pageant controversies
People from San Antonio
Living people
1993 births